The UNC Pembroke Braves are the athletic teams that represent the University of North Carolina at Pembroke, located in Pembroke, North Carolina, in NCAA Division II intercollegiate sports.

The Braves compete as members of Conference Carolinas (CC) for all but one of their 16 varsity sports. The exception, football, has competed in the Mountain East Conference (MEC) since 2020–21. Before the Braves' move to CC, they had also been a member of the MEC in indoor track & field, swimming & diving, and wrestling since 2019–20.

In July 2021, UNCP re-joined CC after an absence of nearly 30 years. The school had been a CC member from 1976–77 to 1991–92 under its former name of Pembroke State University; back when CC was known as the Carolinas Intercollegiate Athletic Conference (CIAC). The Braves were also competed as members of the Peach Belt Conference from 1992–93 to 2020–21.

History

UNC Pembroke's athletic teams are known as the Braves. Due to its heritage as an institution founded for the benefit of American Indians and support from the Lumbee Tribe of North Carolina, the school has largely been immune to the ongoing controversies related to American Indian-themed nicknames and mascots.

National championships

Team

Varsity teams

List of teams

Men's sports
 Baseball
 Basketball
 Cross country
 Football
 Track and field (indoor)
 Track and field (outdoor)
 Wrestling

Women's sports
 Basketball
 Cross country
 Golf
 Soccer
 Softball
 Swimming and diving
 Track and field (indoor)
 Track and field (outdoor)
 Volleyball

References

External links